Thomas A. Barcroft (1870 – 26 September 1946) was the secretary-manager of Blackpool between 1903 and 1909. He was the Seasiders first recognised manager, but his role was not full-time.

A 33-year-old Barcroft was in charge for the first game of the 1903–04 season. Under his leadership, Blackpool won eleven and drew five of their 34 League games. They finished fourth from bottom.

The following campaign, 1904–05, saw an identical finishing position.

They finished 14th in 1905–06, 13th in 1906–07, before another 15th-placed finish in 1907–08.

In his final season at the helm, Blackpool finished bottom and had to apply for re-election to the Football League.

Barcroft remained as secretary at Bloomfield Road for the next quarter-century. On 3 July 1934, he received an illuminated manuscript in recognition of his 31 years of service to the club. He had even deputised in goal during the 1901–02 season, after Joe Dorrington missed the train from Blackpool to Leicester.

He died on 26 September 1946 at his home in Blackpool. He was 75.

Managerial statistics

References

External links
Profile at the League Managers Association
Profile at Soccerbase.com

1870 births
1946 deaths
Footballers from Wigan
English footballers
Association football goalkeepers
Blackpool F.C. players
English Football League players
English football managers
Blackpool F.C. managers
English Football League managers